Jindong Township is a township under the administration of Lizhou District, Guangyuan, Sichuan, China. , it administers Bailonghu Residential Community the following six villages:
Zhanwan Village
Shiqing Village
Qinghe Village
Tiangou Village
Dianzi Village
Changyang Village

References 

Township-level divisions of Sichuan
Lizhou District